A consultative referendum took place in Romania on 26 May 2019, on the same day as the European Parliament elections, about whether to prohibit amnesties and pardons for corruption offences, as well as whether to prohibit the Government from passing emergency ordinances concerning the judiciary and to extend the right to appeal against them to the Constitutional Court. Both proposals were approved by wide margins.

Background 

President Klaus Iohannis signed the decree to hold the referendum on 25 April 2019, after the Parliament had recommended in favour of this referendum in a non-binding vote on 17 April. The first proposal for this referendum to be held was made in early 2017, in the wake of the controversial Ordinance 13 and subsequent protests against corruption in Romania, and President Iohannis announced his intention to hold a referendum on 23 January 2019. However, the procedure was suspended until 2019, when Iohannis decided to extend the issues to be voted on, requiring a new parliamentary procedure. On 4 April, Iohannis announced the issues of the referendum: prohibiting amnesties and pardons for corruption offences, as well as prohibiting the government from adopting emergency ordinances in the field of offences, punishments, and judicial organisation and giving other constitutional authorities the right to submit the ordinances to the Constitutional Court for further review.

Before the parliamentary vote, President Klaus Iohannis sent a letter to leaders of parliamentary parties in order to invite them to a consultation on the referendum, the Alliance of Liberals and Democrats (ALDE) being the only party to decline the invitation. Eugen Tomac, the leader of the People's Movement Party (PMP), proposed an additional question for the referendum on one out of three issues suggested by his party: abolishing special pensions, returning to a two-round system for local elections, and lowering the number of MPs to 300.

On 16 April 2019, the common judiciary committees of the two chambers of the Parliament approved the referendum, the Parliament did so the next day in a non-binding vote. PNL and USR accused the PSD of introducing multiple recommendations that had not been discussed in the judiciary committees. Even though the opposition requested the elimination of these recommendations, government MPs disagreed, thus the report was adopted with 259 votes in favour, 9 votes against and 1 abstention. It is shown, among others, in the report, that amnesties and pardons cannot be a citizens' initiative according to the Constitution, and that the President cannot trigger a legislative referendum according to a Constitutional Court ruling. However, the recommendations were eliminated following another parliamentary vote, that passed with 218 votes in favour, 11 votes against and 3 abstentions.

On 25 April, the spokesperson of the Romanian Presidency, Mădălina Dobrovolschi, announced that President Klaus Iohannis had signed the decree for the referendum and published the two questions to be voted on.

Support and opposition 

In an interview for Antena 3, the then leader of the Social Democratic Party (PSD), Liviu Dragnea, stated that even though his party agrees with the referendum, there are many voices that say that the referendum is actually useless for the publicly expressed purpose and that it actually is a way for Klaus Iohannis to get involved in the electoral campaign so that he can help parties around him. A similar position was shown by the Alliance of Liberals and Democrats (ALDE), the junior partner in the coalition government, that announced its stance in a message on Facebook.

Results
In order for the results to be valid, voter turnout was required to be above 30%, and the number of valid votes above 25% of the registered voters. Both thresholds were passed, validating the results.

References

Romania
2019
May 2019 events in Romania